Francesca Chiara Palamara (born March 25, 1972, in Padua, Italy, as Francesca Chiara Casellati) is the singer and songwriter of the Italian band The LoveCrave.

Biography 
Francesca Chiara's parents are teachers (English and Mathematics) and they still live in Padova, where Francesca was born. Her grandparents lived in Venice, and she descends from a Venetian noble family, the Pisani. Her grandmother's name was Adriana Pisani.

Francesca Chiara spent her childhood going to Venice every weekend and this is why she has always been fascinated by dark and silent atmospheres, where her music finds inspiration. Her first child, where born in 2010 and Chiara is married to Tancredi Palamara.

Musical career 
She wrote her first novel at the age of 10 and she wrote her first song at 13 years old. It was called "Survivor".

At 17 years old she spent one year in San Francisco, California graduating at Castro Valley High School and she began to sing seriously and to play guitar.

She returned to Italy and founded the band Mystery, with Simon Dredo and Mauro Lentola, producing a four-song hard rock EP.

At 19 years old she moved from Padova to Milan and started studying music for three years in a music school but then she left it. She worked in a wedding agency, sold wine through the phone and worked in a concert agency to survive and pay the rent.

She met Tank Palamara in a metal club and they started to collaborate. Their first band was called The Flu in 1996 and it was a new punk metal band. They played all over Italy and participated to the Sanremo Music Festival in 1999.

The first album Il Parco Dei Sogni came out in Italian as a concept album with Sony Music Italy that also produced the video of the song “Streghe” (witches). This is a concept album and the story takes place in the future, after a war. Three girls find themselves in the Old Zone of the city and meet an old lady that brings them through a gate and shows them a wonderful park that was there before the war. There they start living the stories of the people that used to go to that park. Love, death, drugs, loneliness, jealousy and they realize that there is always a hope and that wars can't change the deep essence of mankind. It was released in 1999, it includes the songs Streghe and Ti Amo Che Strano that was presented by Francesca Chiara at the famous Festival di Sanremo in 1999.

After various experiences into electronic and alternative music Tank and Francesca created in year 2003 the new gothic rock band The LoveCrave with Bob Machine on drums and Simon Dredo on bass and released with the band 2006 the album The Angel And The Rain.

Influences 
Inspired by movies like The Crow, Blade Runner, Edward Scissorhands, Matrix ... FC's music has always had a mysterious and aggressive side that creates contrasts with her love for great melodies. Her biggest influences come from the eighties rock/metal (Iron Maiden, Queensryche but also AC/DC, Joan Jett and Sex Pistols...) to the nineties gothic wave (HIM, Paradise Lost...) . "Writing a melody is the hardest part cause it has to be simple, emotional and instinctive and it has to be the mirror of the words you are saying, so every great melody is an influence for me."

Discography 

 1992 - Mystery - EP
 1997 Sony Music Francesca Chiara - L’onda – single
 1998 Sony Music Francesca Chiara – Streghe – single
 1999 Sony Music Francesca Chiara – Ti Amo Che Strano – single
 1999 Sony Music Francesca Chiara - Il Parco Dei Sogni - album
 2006 Repo Records The LoveCrave - The Angel And The Rain - album
 2010 Repo Records The LoveCrave - Soul Saliva - album

Collections 
 1998 - Un Disco Per L'Estate - L'onda
 1998 - Sanremo Giovani 1998 - Streghe
 1999 - 49° Edizione del festival Di Sanremo cd blu- Ti Amo Che Strano
 2006 - Zilloscope 11/06 (ZILLO mag -DE) - Little Suicide
 2006 - Cold Hands Seduction Vol.64 (SONIC SEDUCER mag - DE) - Vampires (The Light That We Are)
 2006 - Loud Sounds (ROCK HARD mag - ITA) - Nobody
 2006 - ClubTRAX Vol. 2 Double CD (XtraX store - DE) - Little Suicide
 2007 - Gothic Magazine Compilation - Can You Hear Me?
 2007 - Summer Darkness 07 (ZILLO mag -DE) - Can You Hear Me?

Video/DVD 
 1999 - Streghe
 2006 - Zillo DVD "Dark Visions" - Fading Roses - colonna sonora
 2007 - Zillo DVD "Dark Visions 2" - Can You Hear Me? live at M'Era Luna Festival
 2007 - Zillo DVD "Dark Visions 2" - Can You Hear Me? colonna sonora menù

References

External links 
 Francesca Chiara's web-site
 - Official MySpace
 The LoveCrave official site

1972 births
Living people
Women heavy metal singers
Italian heavy metal musicians
Women rock singers
Musicians from Padua
21st-century Italian singers
21st-century Italian women singers